The United Nations Correspondents Association (U.N. Correspondents Association), or UNCA,  was founded in New York City in 1948.  It has over 250 members today . It presents the annual UNCA Excellence in Journalism Awards.  The purpose of the awards "is to recognize and encourage excellence in reporting on the United Nations, its affiliated agencies, organizations and missions."

The 2013 Awards were reported in The New York Times:

Executive board
U.N. Correspondents Association
2014 Executive Board

President:
Pamela Falk, CBS News TV and Radio
 
1st Vice President:
Kahraman Haliscelik, TRT Turkish Radio & TV
 
2nd Vice Presidents:
Sylviane Zehil,  L’Orient Le Jour
Masood Haider, Dawn, Pakistan
 
3rd Vice President: 
Erol Avdovic, Webpublicapress 
 
Treasurer:
Bouchra Benyoussef, Maghreb Arab Press
 
Secretary:
Seana Magee, Kyodo News
 
Members at Large: 
 
Nabil Abi Saab, Alhurra TV;
Talal Al-Haj, Al-Arabiya News channel;
Sherwin Bryce-Pease, South African Broadcasting (SABC);
Zhenqiu Gu, Xinhua News Agency;
Melissa Kent,  CBC/Radio Canada;
Evelyn Leopold, Huffington Post Contributor;
Michelle Nichols, Reuters;
Valeria Robecco, ANSA;
Sangwon Yoon, Bloomberg

Excellence in Journalism Awards
The UNCA Excellence in Journalism Awards are presented by the United Nations Correspondents Association. They include:

The Elizabeth Neuffer Memorial Prize
See footnote.
The Elizabeth Neuffer Memorial Prize was established in memory of a journalist for The Boston Globe, who was killed while reporting the war in Iraq in 2003.  The prize is for written media (including online media).

The Ricardo Ortega Memorial Prize
See footnote.
The Ricardo Ortega Memorial Prize was established in honor of a Spanish reporter, who was killed while covering events in Haiti in 2004. The prize is for broadcast (TV & Radio) media.

The Prince Albert II of Monaco and UNCA Global Prize
See footnote.
The prize is for coverage of climate change.

The United Nations Foundation Prize
See footnote.
The United Nations Foundation Prize is for print (including online media) and broadcast media (TV & Radio) for coverage of humanitarian and development aspects of the U.N. and U.N. agencies. The prize is sponsored by the UN Foundation.

References

External links

International journalism organizations
Journalism-related professional associations
Correspondents Association